Rigobert is a masculine given name.

People with the name

 Rigobert (died 743), saint and Benedictine monk
 Rigobert Roger Andely (born 1953), central banker from the Republic of the Congo
 Rigobert Bonne (1727–1794), French cartographer
 Rigobert Gruber (born 1961), German footballer
 Rigobert Massamba, Air Force major general in the Democratic Republic of the Congo
 Rigobert Ngouolali, politician from the Republic of the Congo
 Rigobert Onkassa Edhouba, Gabonese politician
 Rigobert Song (born 1976), Cameroonian footballer and football coach

See also
 Rigoberto (name)
 Rigoberta Menchú (born 1959), K'iche' political and human rights activist from Guatemala

Masculine given names